Red Bull Futsal League (Nepali: रेडबुल फुटसल लिग) is a professional futsal tournament in Nepal, started in 2016.

Total 16 futsal teams or clubs are participant in first tournament.

History
With the aim to promote Futsal in Nepal on a
professional level, Red Bull brings to you the
first ever Red Bull Futsal League 2073. The
league has a lucrative cash prize of NPR 10
Lakh for the champion. Red Bull is the title
sponsor of the league which AMA Events has
organized. With an aim to make football more
popular in the country, Red Bull is associated
with other major tournaments in the country -
Martyrs Memorial A Division League, Red Bull
National League and Red Bull Budha Subba
Gold Cup.
All the teams in Red Bull Futsal League will
compete in 112 games under the home and
away format. The total 16 teams selected from
qualifying rounds have been divided into two
groups of 8 teams each. As the league
progresses, top 4 teams from each group will
play in the Quarter Finals, the Semi Finals and the Finals till the end. The winners of the four- month long league will collect a cash prize of
10 Lakh rupees, while the runners-up will get
Rs. 5 Lakh. The best player of the tournament
and goalkeeper will walk away with a cash
prize of Rs. 50,000 each.
Red bull Futsal League is a biggest futsal tournament of Nepal.

Tournament format
All the teams in
Red Bull Futsal League will compete in 112
games under the home and away format. The
total 16 teams selected from qualifying rounds
have been divided into two groups of 8 teams
each. As the league progresses, top 4 teams from each group will play in the Quarter Finals, the
Semi Finals and the Finals till the end

Winners

Final Result

Prize money
First:-(NR.10,00,000|-)
Second:-(NR.5,00,000|-)

Award of season

Best player

Best Goalkeeper

Source

Nepal
Futsal in Nepal
Football leagues in Nepal
2016 establishments in Nepal